Sekolah Menengah Sains Johor (abbreviated SMSJ),  is a boarding school located in Kluang, Johor, Malaysia. Established on 23 May 1973, SMSJ is the first boarding school or Sekolah Berasrama Penuh (SBP) ever built in the state of Johor. SMSJ is the 16th SBP built in Malaysia under the 2nd Malaysia Plan. In 2023, the school celebrates its 50th year of operation. The school is widely known as Sains Johor and an alumnus of this school is known as a SAJOHA (SAins JOHor Alumni).

History
SMSJ was established in the year 1973 under the Second Malaysia Plan. The foundation of the construction was officiated by the Director of Education, Tun Hamdan bin Sheikh Tahir.

Students of the first batch were placed temporarily in English College Johore Bahru until the completion of the school's infrastructure in the month of April 1974. The first principal was Tuan Syed Ahmad Omar Al-Atas and since then, 13 principals have been on duty.

Situated at a mere one kilometer from Kluang, the school covers an area of 32 acres and it provides ample facilities for secondary students. From the year 1974 to 1984, the school received Form 6 students and from the year 1985 until 1989, the school carried out GCE A-Level. After that, the school maintains receiving only Form 1 to Form 5 students until now.

The main field (Padang A), was completed in 1976 and the second field (Padang B), was completed in 1988. The fields are used for various sports occasions and training .

From 1996 to 2016, the school reserved two classes for students majoring in Technical Science and three classes for students majoring in Pure Science. Since 2022, only Pure Science are offered in the school. Starting from 2023, all Form 4 students will participate in the Dual Language Programme (DLP). SCORE was named a smart school in 1999.

In 2011, the school received the Cluster School title (thanks to the school's tremendous Mathematics and hockey team achievements), and finally in 2012, the school was officially designated as one of the high performance schools in Malaysia.

Principals

Current Batches (as on year 2021)
 Form 5 (EMERALD 1721) (48th batch)
 Form 4 (CELESTIAL 1822) (49th batch)
 Form 3 (FUSION 1923) (50th batch)
 Form 2 (GLORIOUS 2024) (51st batch)
 Form 1 (BRITOS 2125) (52nd batch)

Academic Curricular
Year by year, SMSJ continues to excel in both PMR and SPM, the two major public examinations in Malaysia. The school proves itself to be worthy when it succeed to produce a high percentage of straight "A" scorers for both examinations.

The PMR record was broken in the year 2011 with a school average grade value of 1.01 placing SMSJ on the 7th place among all the other residential schools; successfully beating other elite schools and past high-achievers.

The SPM record in the other hand is still being held by the 2021 batch with a school average grade of 1.47 placing SMSJ on the 9th place among all other residential schools.

Notable alumni
 YB Hj Aminolhuda Hj Hassan - Johor State EXCO 2018-2022 Pengerusi Jawatankuasa Hal Ehwal Agama Islam & Pendidikan Negeri Johor, Pengerusi AMANAH Negeri Johor
 YBhg Datuk Dr Mohd Shah Mahmood - Director of National Forensic Medicine Institute, Malaysia
 YB Datuk Ahmad Maslan - Former Deputy Minister of International Trade and Industry, Ahli Parlimen Pontian
 YBhg Dato' Hidayat Abdul Hamid - Malaysia High Commissioner to India
 YBhg Datuk Dr. Aminuddin Hassim - Presiden Perbadanan Putrajaya
 YBhg Prof Dr Ghizan Salleh - Ketua Kluster Pertanian & Makanan Majlis Profesor Negara, Former 1st SAJOHA President
 Dato’ Haji Azmar Talib - CEO TRX Tun Razak Exchange City Sdn Bhd
 Dato' Hj Ahmad Ridza bin Bukhari - Owner Ain Furnishing Sdn Bhd
 YBhg. Datuk Hj. Ahamad Kamel Ismail - General Manager Yayasan Melaka
 Datuk Ir Zainudin A.Kadir - Former CEO Projek Lintasan Kota Holdings Sdn Bhd (Prolintas)
 Dato' Azman Mohd Arof - Owner Aerosystem Tour & Travel Sdn Bhd (Bas Ekspress Mayang Sari)
 Dato' Sr Rosli Atan - Managing Director Ian Scott International- Rentier Advisory Services Sdn. Bhd.
 Datin Rashidah Mohd Sies - Setiausaha Bahagian, Bahagian Syarikat Pelaburan Kerajaan, Kementerian Kewangan
 Ragunath Kesavan - Former President of the Malaysian Bar Council
 Tuan Hj Salehuddin Hj Hassan - Datuk Bandar Majlis Bandaraya Iskandar Puteri (MBIP) Iskandar Puteri City Council
 Tuan Hj Zulkifly Hj Mohd Tahir - Pegawai Daerah Pontian District
 Tuan Hj Azman Haji Mohamed Shah - CEO Kumpulan Pendidikan Yayasan Pelajaran Johor (KPYPJ)
 Encik Mohammad Diah Hj Wahari - Ketua Pegawai Maklumat (CIO) Kementerian Komunikasi dan Multimedia Malaysia
 Encik Zainal Abas - Pengarah Bahagian Sukan, Kokurikulum dan Kesenian-KPM, Former Head Coach of Malaysia National Athletics, Former TV Sports Announcer
 Zainal Alam Abd Kadir - Associate Editor The Malaysian Reserve
 Shamsudin Ali - Cromok Band Vocalist and Bassist
 Dr Mohd Mazri Yahya - Vascular Surgery Specialist KPJ Johor, Timbalan Pesuruhjaya PAS Negeri Johor
 Amir Hassan - Blogger Denaihati.com
 Vikneswaran Iswarapatham - Deputy President Kuala Lumpur Hockey Association (KLHA), Former coach Pasukan Hoki Terengganu-THT (Terengganu Hockey Team), Former Malaysia National Hockey Player
 Azmi Samuri - Chief Information Security Officer Bank Islam Malaysia
 Mohd Rezwan Abdullah Ismail - Chief Risk And Compliance Officer Tabung Haji Malaysia
 Mohd Rizal Jailan - Managing Director Inokom Corporation Sdn Bhd
 Ahmad Shahriman Mohd Shariff - CEO CIMB Islamic Bank Malaysia

External links
 

1973 establishments in Malaysia
Co-educational boarding schools
Educational institutions established in 1973
Kluang District